Accommodation is a legal obligation entered into as a gratuitous favor without consideration, such as a signature guaranteeing payment of a debt. This is sometimes called an accommodation endorsement.

Contract law